Cleopatra is an unincorporated community located in McLean County, Kentucky, United States. It was also known as Tichenors Store. Thomas Cicero (T.C.) Tichenor established a store in 1867.  Cleopatra was incorporated by the Commonwealth of Kentucky in 1862.  The boundaries of the town were defined as half a mile in each of four directions from a stone in front of Tichenors Store.  The 1884 edition of the Kentucky State Gazetteer and Business Directory describes Cleopatra as having a population of 50 with semi-weekly mail service.  Tichenor served as the postmaster.  Other enterprises listed include M.D. Bandy, blacksmith; Reverend J. A. Brooks (Baptist preacher); A B. Hadon, grocer; J.F. McGuin, carpenter; G.W. Moseley, flour mill; Sherwood Massey, coal miner; C.R. Robertson, physician and W.K. Robertson, pharmacist.  Tichenors store is described as a dry goods store. Tichenor eventually sold his store to a brother-in-law, James Fincastle "Fin" Short who eventually sold to Courtland Lee (C.L.) Short.  The building burned in 1918.  In 1923, Mr. and Mrs. W. E. Leachman converted a lodge hall into a store.

References

Unincorporated communities in McLean County, Kentucky
Unincorporated communities in Kentucky